Bangana discognathoides is a species of cyprinid fish endemic to China.

References

Bangana
Fish described in 1927
Taxa named by John Treadwell Nichols
Taxa named by Clifford H. Pope